Sunburst Races is a half marathon, 10k, 5k event located in South Bend, Indiana. It is held annually on the first Saturday in June. The races start in Downtown South Bend and finishes at the University of Notre Dame. The race is owned and managed by Beacon Health System.

The latest edition of the race took place on September 25, 2021 after the cancellation of the 2020 event.

List of winners of the Sunburst Marathon

Men's

Women's

See also

 List of marathon races in North America

References

External links
 Official website
 Sunburst Marathon Winners

Marathons in the United States
Sports competitions in Indiana
Sports in South Bend, Indiana
June sporting events
Recurring sporting events established in 1984
1984 establishments in Indiana